This is the discography of South Korean R&B duo Fly to the Sky. They debuted in 1999 under SM Entertainment and were initially pitched as a duo who could sing a variety of genres, before transitioning into R&B beginning with their third album.

Albums

Studio albums

Live albums

Compilation albums

Extended plays

Singles

As lead artist

Contributed singles and tracks

Charted songs

References

External links
Discography on Naver Music

Discography
Discographies of South Korean artists
Rhythm and blues discographies
K-pop music group discographies